The 2018 NCAA Division I Indoor Track and Field Championships was the 54th NCAA Men's Division I Indoor Track and Field Championships and the 37th NCAA Women's Division I Indoor Track and Field Championships, held at the Gilliam Indoor Track Stadium in College Station, Texas near the campus of the host school, the Texas A&M University. In total, thirty-four different men's and women's indoor track and field events were contested from March 9 to March 10, 2018.

Results

Men's results

60 meters
Final results shown, not prelims

200 meters
Final results shown, not prelims

400 meters
Final results shown, not prelims

800 meters
Final results shown, not prelims

Mile
Final results shown, not prelims

3000 meters

5000 meters

60 meter hurdles
Final results shown, not prelims

4 x 400 meters relay

1 The USC time of 3:00.77 was rejected as a record as the team consisted of three Americans and one from Antigua and Barbuda: IAAF rules require all runners of a relay team to be of the same nationality for records.

Distance Medley Relay

High Jump

Pole Vault

Long Jump

Triple Jump

Shot Put

Weight Throw

Heptathlon

Men's team scores
Top 10 and ties shown

Women's results

60 meters
Final results shown, not prelims

200 meters
Final results shown, not prelims

400 meters
Final results shown, not prelims

800 meters
Final results shown, not prelims

Mile
Final results shown, not prelims

3000 meters

5000 meters

60 meter hurdles
Final results shown, not prelims

4 x 400 meters relay

Distance Medley Relay

High Jump

Pole Vault

Long Jump

Triple Jump

Shot Put

Weight Throw

Pentathlon

Women's team scores
Top 10 and ties shown

See also
 NCAA Men's Division I Indoor Track and Field Championships 
 NCAA Women's Division I Indoor Track and Field Championships

References
 

NCAA Indoor Track and Field Championships
NCAA Division I Indoor Track and Field Championships
NCAA Division I Indoor Track and Field Championships
NCAA Division I Indoor Track and Field Championships